
There are around 131 villages in Parner tehsil of Ahmednagar district of state of Maharashtra. Following is the list of villages in Parner tehsil.

A
  Akkalwadi
  Alkuti
  Apadhup
  Astagaon

B
  Babhulwade
  Baburdi
  Bhalwani
  Bhandgaon
  Bhondre
  Bhoyare Gangarda

C
  Chincholi
  Chombhut

D
  Daithane Gunjal
  Darodi
  Desawade
  Devibhoaire
  Dhawalpuri
  Dhoki
  Dhotre Bk
  Diksal

G
  Ganji Bhoyare
  Gargundi
  Garkhindi
  Gatewadi
  Ghanegaon
  Goregaon
  Gunaore
  Gadilgaon

H
  Hanga
  Hattalkhindi
  Hiware Korda
  Handewada

J
  Jadhvawadi
  Jamgaon
  Jategaon
  Jawala

K
  Kadus
  Kalewadi,Astagaon
  Kakane Wadi
  Kalas
  Kalkup
  Kanhur Pathar
  Karandi
  Karegaon
  Karjule Harya
  Kasare
  Katalwedha
  Khadakwadi
  Kinhi
  Kohkadi
  Kurund
 KALEWADI

L
  Loni Haveli
  Lonimawala

M
  Mahskewadi
  Malkup
  Mandave Kd
  Mawale Wadi
  Mhasane
  Mungashi

N
  Nandur Pathar
  Narayan Gawhan
  Nighoj

P
  Pabal
  Padali Aale
  Padali Darya
  Padali Kanhur
  Padali Ranjangaon
  Palashi
  Palspur
  Palwe Bk
  Palwe Kd
  Panoli
  Parner
  Patharwadi
  Pimpalgaon Rotha
  Pimpalgaon Turk
  Pimpalner
  Pimpri Gawali
  Pimpri Jalsen
  Pimpri Pathar
  Pokhari
  Punewadi

R
  Raitale
  Ralegan Siddhi
  Ralegan Therpal
  Randhe
  Ranjangaon Mashid
  Renwadi
  Rui Chattrapati

S
  Sangvi Surya
  Sarola Adwai
  Sawargaon
  Shanjapur
  Sherikasare
  Shirapur
  Sidheshwar Wadi
  Supa

T
  Takali Dhokeshwar
  Tikhol
  Taralwadi

V
  Vesdare
  Viroli

W
  Wadegawhan
  Wadgaon Amali
  Wadgaon Darya
  Wadgaon Savtal
  Wadner Bk
  Wadner Haveli
  Wadule
  Wadzire
  Waghunde Bk
  Waghunde Kd
  Walwane
  Wankute
  Wasunde

Y
  Yadavwadi

See also

 Parner tehsil
 Tehsils in Ahmednagar
 Villages in Akole tehsil
 Villages in Jamkhed tehsil
 Villages in Karjat tehsil
 Villages in Kopargaon tehsil
 Villages in Nagar tehsil
 Villages in Nevasa tehsil
 Villages in Pathardi tehsil
 Villages in Rahata tehsil
 Villages in Rahuri tehsil
 Villages in Sangamner tehsil
 Villages in Shevgaon tehsil
 Villages in Shrigonda tehsil
 Villages in Shrirampur tehsil

References

 
 
Parner